List of the National Register of Historic Places listings in Poughkeepsie, New York

This is intended to be a complete list of properties and districts listed on the National Register of Historic Places in the city and town of Poughkeepsie, New York, including the hamlet of New Hamburg.  The locations of National Register properties and districts (at least for all showing latitude and longitude coordinates below) may be seen in an online map by clicking on "Map of all coordinates".

Numerous properties were listed as result of a 1980 study of historic resources in Poughkeepsie, which nominated 59 historic districts and individual properties.  One that was nominated but not listed, due to owner objection, was the Innis Dye Works.



Current listings

|}

See also

 National Register of Historic Places listings in Dutchess County, New York
 National Register of Historic Places listings in New York
 List of armories and arsenals in New York City and surrounding counties

References

Poughkeepsie